Shivana Takli Dam, is an earthfill dam on Shivna river near Kannad, Aurangabad district in the state of Maharashtra in India.

Specifications

Purpose
 Irrigation

See also
 Dams in Maharashtra
 List of reservoirs and dams in India

References

Dams in Aurangabad district, Maharashtra
Dams completed in 2005
2005 establishments in Maharashtra